Gartnait of Buchan is the first mormaer of Buchan to be known by name. He was married to a woman named Ete (or Ite), the daughter of a Gille Míchéil, whom he appears alongside in a grant to Deer recorded in the Gaelic Notes on the Book of Deer. This is surely Gille Míchéil, mormaer of Fife. The same source tells us that Gartnait was the son of Cainnech, although it does not tell us if this Cainnech had previously been mormaer.

He had a daughter Éva, whom he married to Colbán, his successor. 
The Foundation for Medieval Genealogy states he died after 1132 and that Colban succeeded in 1135, therefore it is likely Gartnait died in or before 1135.

Bibliography
 Anderson, Alan Orr, Early Sources of Scottish History: AD 500-1286, 2 Vols (Edinburgh, 1922)
 Roberts, John L., Lost Kingdoms: Celtic Scotland in the Middle Ages, (Edinburgh, 1997), pp. 49–50

References

External links
 Gaelic Notes on the Book of Deer

People from Aberdeenshire
12th-century mormaers
Mormaers of Buchan
1130s deaths
Year of birth unknown
Year of death uncertain